Microsoft Adventure is a 1979 interactive fiction game from Microsoft, based on the PDP-10 mainframe game Colossal Cave Adventure, and released for the TRS-80, Apple II, and later for the IBM PC.  It was programmed for the company by Gordon Letwin of Softwin Associates.

Gameplay
Microsoft Adventure is a text game of cave exploration and treasure gathering where the player enters one- or two-word commands to direct the computer to move and manipulate objects, and points are awarded for areas explored and for treasure acquired. It contains 130 rooms, 15 treasures, 40 useful objects and 12 problems to be solved. The progress of two games can be saved on a diskette. The game features most of the content as Colossal Cave Adventure, along with a few locations unique to this version.

Release
Microsoft originally released Microsoft Adventure in 1979 for the TRS-80 and the Apple II under its new division, Microsoft Consumer Products. IBM later included Microsoft Adventure as the only game in the initial software releases for the IBM Personal Computer, making it one of the first two games available for the new computer along with DONKEY.BAS (which was included in the operating system). It was released on a single-sided 5 inch disk, required 32K RAM, as a self-booting disk; it could not be opened from DOS.

Reception
Carrington Dixon reviewed Microsoft Adventure in The Space Gamer No. 49. Dixon commented that "No game that exists on several different computers can fully demonstrate the potential of any one computer. Even so, your [money] buys many hours of cave exploring and treasure snatching. There is only one 'set-up' but that one is rich and complex enough to keep anyone busy for many games. I suspect that many people will come back to the one after some flashier games have been permanently set aside." PC Magazine also reviewed the game positively, writing, "This hoary old classic should be included in any player's collection of games for the IBM PC."

References

External links
Review in Compute!'s Guide to Adventure Games

1979 video games
1970s interactive fiction
Adventure games
Apple II games
IBM software
Microsoft games
Single-player video games
TRS-80 games
Video game remakes
Video games developed in the United States